List of trade unions in Russia:

Defunct trade unions
 All-Russian Teachers' Union, 1890s - 1918
 All-Russian Metalworkers Union
 Trade unions in the Soviet Union

Trade Union groupings
 All-Russian Confederation of Labour, formed in 1995, affiliated with the International Trade Union Confederation (ITUC) and the General Confederation of Trade Unions.
 Confederation of Labour of Russia, formed in 1995, affiliated with the ITUC.
 Confederation of Revolutionary Anarcho-Syndicalists, formed in 1995, affiliated with the International Workers' Association.
 Federation of Independent Trade Unions of Russia, formed in 1990, affiliated with the ITUC.
 General Confederation of Trade Unions, formed in 1992.
 Siberian Confederation of Labour

See also 

 Russian labour law

References

External links
 Site of trade unions in Russia

Trade unions
Russia